In mathematics, Brauer's theorem, named for Richard Brauer, may refer to:
Brauer's theorem on forms
Brauer's theorem on induced characters (also called the Brauer-Tate theorem). 
Brauer's main theorems
Brauer–Suzuki theorem

See also
 Brouwer fixed-point theorem